Xenophora cerea is a species of large sea snail, a marine gastropod mollusc in the family Xenophoridae, the carrier shells.

Description

Distribution

References

Xenophoridae
Gastropods described in 1845